Jan Bouwman (27 November 1935 – 18 December 1999) was a Dutch swimmer. He competed at the 1960 Summer Olympics in the 100 m freestyle, but failed to reach the final.

References

1935 births
1999 deaths
Dutch male freestyle swimmers
Olympic swimmers of the Netherlands
Swimmers at the 1960 Summer Olympics
People from Heemstede
Sportspeople from North Holland